Harrie Stephen Seward (26 February 1884 – 23 July 1958) was an Australian politician.

The brother of Leo Seward, and the son Stephen Seward (1853-1923), and Mary Ellen Seward (?1849-1935), née Kelleher, Harrie Stephen Seward was born at Rochester, Victoria.

He was educated in Ballarat at St Patrick's College. He became a bank officer, and moved to Western Australia, becoming a farmer at Pingelly from 1913.

He served in the military 1915–1919.

In 1933 he was elected to the Western Australian Legislative Assembly as the Country Party member for Pingelly, serving as Minister for Railways and Transport from 1947 until 1948.

In 1950, he left the Assembly, and in 1951 was elected to the Australian Senate as a federal Country Party Senator for Western Australia. He held the seat until his death in 1958.

References

1884 births
1958 deaths
Members of the Australian Senate for Western Australia
Members of the Western Australian Legislative Assembly
National Party of Australia members of the Parliament of Western Australia
National Party of Australia members of the Parliament of Australia
People from Pingelly, Western Australia
20th-century Australian politicians
People educated at St Patrick's College, Ballarat